Kurt-Werner Wichmann (8 August 1949 – 25 April 1993) was a German serial killer who was possibly linked to the Göhrde Murders.

Youth 
Wichmann was first sent to a young offenders' institution at the age of 14 after he had threatened a subletting tenant in his parents' house with a knife and had tried to strangle her. At that time, Wichmann did not live at home but at a care home in Wichernstift. He did not want to stay there any longer, and to this end stole money from his parents. His father was a violent man who reportedly mistreated his sons. 

At 16, Wichmann attacked a cyclist and sexually abused her, for which he received six months' probation.

In 1967, he threatened police officers with a small-calibre weapon. He was sentenced to one year of juvenile detention.

In 1968, 38-year-old Ilse G. was shot four times in the back with a small-calibre rifle while riding a bicycle in a forest near Lüneburg. She died on the spot. Witnesses saw a youth fitting Wichmann's description fleeing the scene, and the police started a file on him. Although small-calibre rifles and newspaper clippings were found in his possession, Wichmann was not charged.

In 1970, Wichmann was sentenced to five-and-a-half years of juvenile punishment for the rape of a hitchhiker, whom he also tried to strangle. The hitchhiker managed to persuade him to let her go. When Wichmann read the news in the newspaper, he felt misrepresented and went to the police to correct this, which led to his arrest.

Description 
Wichmann was described as a blond, down-to-earth man with a well-groomed appearance. A witness described him as a silent man with "cold, icy eyes eyeing everything". Others described him as an arrogant and egotistical loner.

He lived in a house in a cul-de-sac on the forested edge of Lüneberg. He grew up in that house, had a German shepherd, and leaned toward fascist political attitudes – on his property he occasionally hoisted the Reichskriegsflagge. In the course of time, he had also made several modifications to the house, including secret caches and a door that led to nothing.

Disappearance of Birgit Meier 
In 1989, a few weeks after the disappearance of Birgit Meier, connections between her and Wichmann became apparent. Initially, investigators suspected that she had died by suicide or had been killed by her husband, but they later focused the investigation on Wichmann, who was working as a gardener at the Lüneberg cemetery. Meier had previously met Wichmann at a party, according to statements from her husband. He had previously done gardening work for some of the Meiers' neighbors. Wichmann was interrogated, and despite the flimsy alibi of being with his wife and walking the dog, he was not checked closely. He also concealed the fact that he was on sick leave at the time of Meier's disappearance, but the police did not inquire further.

Only with the establishment of a new prosecutor in Lüneberg did further investigations begin. In 1993, charges of suspected murder in Birgit Meier's case were brought against Wichmann, and the police searched his house. Investigators found two small-caliber rifles, a converted sharp gas pistol, stun guns, mufflers, handcuffs, sedatives and sleeping pills, as well as a secret torture room with a soundproof door, which only he and his brother were allowed to enter. There was a buried, red Ford sports coupe in the backyard, with blood on its back seat. Body-tracking dogs were used several times to search the property, but no bodies were found.

Wichmann fled and was arrested in Heilbronn when he was involved in a traffic accident; weapons were found in his vehicle. His younger brother, with whom he had a close relationship, was in the seat next to him. Ten days after his arrest, the 43-year-old Wichmann hanged himself in the Heimsheim Prison. He had attempted suicide previously. He left strange farewell letters in which he asked, among other things, his brother to clean the gutter. After his death, the murders in the woods around Lüneberg ceased, and further investigation was discontinued. His vehicle and the items found in it were disposed of by police.

Birgit Meier's remains were recovered in 2017 under the concrete floor of a garage of a house on the outskirts of Lüneburg that Wichmann had previously occupied.

On 19 January 2018, it became known via an autopsy report from the Hannover Medical School that Birgit Meier had been shot. Lüneberg Police President Robert Kruse stated that the perpetrator was a serial killer who may have killed beyond Germany. He announced a thorough review of old cases, with Wichmann being considered as a possible suspect. As a result, analysts from the State Criminal Police Office of Lower Saxony filtered out 24 unsolved cases, in particular homicides and missing persons. In February 2018, the case was featured on the television show Aktenzeichen XY... ungelöst, as the investigators suspected that there was a helper, accomplice or a confidant.

Investigations 
The success of the police investigation was due in part to policeman Wolfgang Sielaff, the brother of the murdered Birgit Meier, who began with private research in 2002 and found his sister's body in 2017. In the same year, the police set up a new six-member investigative force which investigated Wichmann's connections with more than 20 other murder victims.

Göhrde Murders 
In December 2017, 28 years after the 1989 murders, the Lower Saxony Police announced that the former cemetery gardener Wichmann was a prime suspect in the Göhrde Murders, and an investigation team was set up. DNA traces from one of the victim's stolen vehicles was linked to Wichmann. The police assumed that there was also an accomplice who may have committed other crimes. The essential clue for a second person involved in the case derives from the fact that Wichmann had driven his own motor vehicle into the Göhrde but had returned with that of the victim. It is unknown if someone brought his car back. According to Sielaff's findings, there were 21 unresolved murder cases in Lüneberg and the surrounding area, which could possibly be assigned to Wichmann.

See also 
 List of German serial killers

References 

1949 births
1989 crimes
1993 deaths
1993 suicides
German rapists
German serial killers
Male serial killers
People from Lüneburg (district)
Serial killers who committed suicide in prison custody
Suicides by hanging in Germany